Admiral Mark Robinson (25 April 1722 – 23 November 1799) was an officer of the British Royal Navy, one of several members of the Robinson family to serve at sea.

After serving as Lieutenant on several ships, Mark Robinson was promoted to captain of the 70-gun third rate  on 13 August 1760. In the mid-1770s he was captain of the 64-gun, third-rate .

During the American Revolutionary War he participated in several fleet actions against the French. As captain of Worcester he was at the First Battle of Ushant on 27 July 1778. Worcester was heavily engaged in the rear division under command of Sir Hugh Palliser. He participated in the Battle of Martinique on 17 April 1780, under Sir Samuel Hood and the French Admiral comte de Guichen. Robinson led the division under Rear Admiral Drake, losing six men killed, and fourteen wounded.

He distinguished himself at the Battle of the Chesapeake on 5 September 1781. In the course of the engagement, Shrewsbury lost fourteen men killed, and fifty-two wounded, including Robinson, who lost a leg from cannon shot. Unable to return to sea, he was granted a pension. When he became, by seniority, entitled to a flag, he was placed on the list of superannuated rear admirals.

Robinson and Horatio Nelson

Nelson served under Robinson on Worcester as acting fourth lieutenant (8 October 1776 – April 1777). The experience of escorting convoys in the wintery seas to and from Gibraltar completed Nelson's midshipman training. On Worcesters return to England on 3 April, Nelson then completed his lieutenancy examination on 9 April.

Nelson was to subsequently write about this period: "But although my age might have been a sufficient cause for not entrusting me with the charge of a Watch, yet Captain Robinson used to say,'he felt as easy when I was upon deck,as any Officer in the ship".

References

 Jenkins, E H (London 1973) "History of the French Navy", 
 Rear-Admiral Lord Nelson Sketches of My Life
 Knight, Roger (2005). "The Pursuit of Victory: The Life and Achievement of Horatio Nelson". Basic Books. 
 Sugden, John Nelson  "A Dream of Glory". Jonathan Cape. London. 
 John Charnock "Biographica Navalis", Volume VI, London, 1798, pp 404–406
 Mahan, A. T. "The Major Operations of the Navies in the War of American Independence",

External links 
"Mark Robinson letter National Archives"
 Gutenberg on line edition of A. T Mahan's works

1722 births
1799 deaths
Royal Navy admirals
Royal Navy personnel of the American Revolutionary War